Woodland Heights, VA is a neighborhood in the city of Richmond, Virginia.  It began as a trolleycar neighborhood in the early 1900s and was built up along the James River beside Forest Hill Park. Woodland Heights is listed on the National Register of Historic Places and the Virginia Landmarks Registry.

History
Woodland Heights was first advertised in 1891 as a luxury riverside retreat with proximity to downtown Richmond and Forest Hill Park.  At this time, the "South Bank" of the James River was still mainly farms and woodlands along Old Manchester's western edge. Woodland Heights is the oldest of three sister neighborhoods built along the Rhodes trolley car line, along with Westover Hills and Forest Hill.

Architecture
Amongst the first homes built in Woodland Heights was the T.D. Mann House. It was built in 1890, in the popular Victorian Queen Anne style.

Many subsequent homes built in Woodland Heights were of the American Four Square design from the Sears Roebuck catalog.

Notable events

Woodland Heights holds an annual House Tour and craft fair.  It is located within walking distance of Forest Hill Park, Canoe Run Park, and Carter Jones Park.  Forest Hill Park holds a farmer's market on Saturdays.

References

External links
Woodland Heights Neighborhood Association Site
Hills and Heights neighborhood news blog

Historic districts on the National Register of Historic Places in Virginia
Neighborhoods in Richmond, Virginia
National Register of Historic Places in Richmond, Virginia